Anne Bachelier (born 20 February 1949 in Louvigne du Desert, France), is a French artist and illustrator.

Biography
She was educated at the Ecole des Beaux Arts, La Seyne-Sur-Mer between 1966 and 1970. She married Claude Bachelier in 1969 and had three children.

Before returning to the "classic" work of oil painting, she worked on silk for ten years (where she began to explore the same themes as today). Among these orders she worked on the interior decoration of private Falcon aircraft for the firm Dassault.

Then having reached the maximum of what it could allow this technique, she abandoned it in 1989 and focused on oil painting.

She presented her paintings for the first time at Corenc at the Château de la Condamine.

Artistic style
Metamorphosis, transition, and evolution provide the common threads of the art of Anne Bachelier. The artist captivates her audience with compelling, highly imaginative images that are distinct, unique, inventive and immediately recognizable. Her metaphysical, dream-like fantasies evoke feelings simultaneously powerful, peaceful, and protective. This unique "other" world, untouched by time or place, reminds the viewer of the eternal dance of transformation and regeneration.

Personal exhibitions

1989
Château de la Condamine, Corenc (Isère, France)
1990
Galerie Promédiart, Aix en Provence
Galerie VRG St Germain, Paris
Galerie St Vincent, Lyon
1991
Galerie Vendôme en l'Isle, Paris
Vendôme, Saint Paul de Vence
Galerie C.Fernet, Brussels
1992
CFM  Gallery, New York (Expo de groupe)
Galerie C.Fernet, Brussels
Galerie Vent des Cimes, Grenoble
Galerie VRG St Germain, Paris and St Paul de Vence
Galerie Albert 1er, Antibes
1993
CFM Gallery, New York
Galerie St Vincent, Lyon
Galerie Schêmes, Lille
1994
CFM Gallery, New York (Expo de groupe)
Galerie VRG, Paris
Galerie Vent des Cimes, Grenoble
1995
CFM Gallery, New York
Galerie St Vincent, Lyon
Galerie Le Fleuron, Honfleur
Galerie Vendôme Dinard, Dinard
1996
CFM Gallery, New York (Expo de groupe)
Galerie Vendôme Rive Droite, Paris
Galerie St Vincent, Lyon
Galerie d'Arcadie, Le Mans
1997
CFM Gallery, New York
Galerie St Vincent, Lyon
Galerie Vent des Cimes, Grenoble
1998
CFM Gallery, New York (Rose Daughter)
Galerie Vendôme Rive Droite, Paris
1999
CFM Gallery, New York ("Intermezzo" Jeu de Cartes)
Galerie Vendôme Rive Droite, Paris
Galerie Vent des Cimes, Grenoble
2000
CFM Gallery, New York
Galerie Vendôme Rive Droite, Paris
2001
CFM Gallery, New York (The Book/Le Livre)
Galerie Vendôme Rive Droite, Paris (Drawings/Dessins)
Galerie TRACE, Maastricht
Galerie vent des Cimes, Grenoble(Expo de groupe)
Weinstein Gallery, San Francisco(Expo de groupe)
2002
CFM Gallery, New York(Expo de groupe)
Weinstein Gallery, San Francisco
Galerie du Dauphin, Honfleur
2003
CFM Gallery, New York
Hanson Gallery, New Orleans
Galerie Vent des Cimes, Grenoble
2004
CFM Gallery, New York (Night in Venice)
Galerie du Vieux Saint Paul, Saint Paul de Vence
2005
CFM Gallery, New York (Alice In Wonderland Tea Party)
Weinstein Gallery, San Francisco
2006
CFM Gallery, New York
Galerie Vent des Cimes, Grenoble
Galerie du Dauphin, Honfleur
2007
CFM Gallery, New York
Galerie Vent des Cimes, Grenoble
2008
Galerie Les Tourelles – Brioude
Chapelle des Jésuites – Chaumont sur Marne
2009
Galerie du Dauphin- Honfleur
CFM Gallery- New York-pour le livre "Le Fantôme de l'Opéra"
Weinstein Gallery- San Francisco 
Galerie Vent des Cimes- Grenoble
2010
CFM Gallery, New York
Galerie "Au temps qui Passe" Génolier-Suisse
2011
Galerie Aggie Hendrickx -Roermond-Pays Bas
Galerie M.Marciano-Paris
2012
Sakah galerie – Toulouse
Galerie Au temps qui Passe-Genolier (Suisse)
Galerie Vent des Cimes-Grenoble(octobre/Novembre)
CFM Gallery – New York – pour le livre "13 plus 1 by Edgar Allan Poe
Gallery Minerva – Asheville, N.Carolina

Group exhibitions

1990
26th salon du Dauphiné-Fondation Uckermann-Grenoble
"Cinq sur Cinq" Association l'Esthète
1991/1992
Salon des Artistes Français
1992
1st salon d'art Contemporain-Dinard
1993
"Rêves d'Enfants" – Galerie VRG-Paris
1994
"Regards sur les Arts – Lamballe
1995
"Un quart des Siècle à la Condamine" Corenc(38)
1996
1st Biennale Internationale des Arts – Rosny sous Bois
"Autour de Colette" Moulin de Vauboyer- Bièvres en Essonne
"France Japon" Tokio
"20 artistes Français-Japonais " Espace Nesle- Paris
1997
"International XXX Peep Show" – CFM Gallery – New York
1998
17th salon d'Angers
1999
"51st Salon Violet" Paris
2001
"L'art actuel Chine-Japon- France" Pekin
"Les Artistes prennent le Pli" Musée de la Poste- Paris
2005
"L'Art Actuel France Japon" Matsumoto
2006
"L'Art Actuel France Japon" Tianjin
2008
"Flesh and Passion – The Fervor of Saint Sebastian" – CFM Gallery, New York
2012
Imagine Gallery-Sudbury(Suffolk) "Reliquary"

Exhibitions with the LIBELLULE Group
2008
"Anges Exquis"  – *Chapelle des Jésuites Chaumont sur Marne
"Anges Exquis"  – *Viechtach – Bavière
"Anges Exquis"  – *Galerie à l'Ecu de France- Viroflay
2009
"Anges exquis"  – *Florence/Piombino-Italie`
"Anges exquis" et "Point d'exclamation" – *Chateau de Vascoeuil
"Black and White"  – *Salon Comparaisons- Grand Palais -Paris
2010
"$1,000,000"  –  *Paris Grand Palais
"Exclamations"  – *Viechtach-Altes rathaus
"Exclamations"  – *Orléans-Collègiale Saint Pierre
"Exclamations"  – *Chaumont en Champagne-Chapelle des jésuites
2011
"Anges Exquis" – *Nevers Palais Ducal
"Phenix et Dragons" –  *Paris Grand Palais
"Anges exquis"  –  *Riegersburg-Barockschloss
"Exclamations"  –  *Vienne(Autriche) Phanstasten Museum-Palais Palfy

2012
"Exclamations"  –  *Orléans
"$1,000,000"    –  *Chamalières
"Phenix et Dragons" – *Chaumont en Champagne-Chapelle des Jésuites
"Phenix et Dragons" – *Viechtach-(Bavière) Biennale d'art fantastique
"Phenix et Dragons" – *Paris Grand Palais

Books
Rose Daughter – a Re-telling of Beauty and the Beast (1998). Text: Robin McKinley. Illustrations: Anne Bachelier. Published by CFM Gallery, NYC.
Princess of Wax / Princesse de Cire (2003). Text: Scot D. Ryersson & Michael Orlando Yaccarino. Illustrations: Anne Bachelier. Published by CFM Gallery, NYC.
Alice's Adventures in Wonderland & Through the Looking Glass and What Alice Found There (2005). Text: Lewis Carroll. Illustrations Anne Bachelier. Published by CFM Gallery, NYC.
Phantom of the Opera / L'Fantome de l'Opera (2009). Text: Gaston Leroux. Illustrations by Anne Bachelier. Published by CFM Gallery, NYC.
13 by Edgar Allan Poe (2012). Text: Edgar Allan Poe. Illustrations: Anne Bachelier. Published by CFM Gallery, NYC.
The Book / Le Livre (2001). Anne Bachelier. Published by CFM Gallery, NYC.

French artists
Living people
1949 births